Exeter House was an early 17th-century brick-built mansion, which stood in Full Street, Derby until demolished in 1854. Named for the Earls of Exeter, whose family owned the property until 1757, the house was notable for the stay of Charles Edward Stuart during the Jacobite Rising of 1745. Exeter House was replaced by offices, which in turn were replaced by Charles Aslin's Magistrates Courts, built on the site during 1935. The courts were closed at the beginning of 2004, and after a decade vacant the building returned to use as an office development, Riverside Chambers.

This is where Charles Edward Stuart ("Bonnie Prince Charlie" or "The Young Pretender") took up residence on 4 December 1745. His host was the widowed mother of Samuel Ward. Ward was employed as the Young Pretender's food taster.

On the morning of 5 December a Council of War was called at Exeter House. The commander of the prince's forces, Lord George Murray, argued that the lack of support from the French and from English Jacobites made success unlikely and retreat necessary. The prince was opposed to a retreat, and some members of the Council objected strongly and aggressively to giving up their advance on London. Meeting with the Council again later in the day, the prince took the decision to retreat, and he left Exeter House the following morning. He gave Ward's mother a diamond ring in thanks for their service before he left. The decision to retreat meant that the Young Pretender would not take George II's crown and his army returned to Scotland, where they were finally defeated in 1746 at the Battle of Culloden.

After the death of the 8th Earl in 1754, the house was sold in 1757 by his widow to John Bingham, Mayor of Derby for that year. Bingham lived at the house until his death in 1773 after which, in 1795, Jedediah Strutt purchased it. Strutt lived there until his death in 1797. The last owner was a lawyer, William Eaton Mousely, twice Mayor of Derby, who, after making some alterations in the 1830s, had the house demolished in 1854, believing Exeter House to be too large to maintain, and also to allow improvements to Exeter Bridge.

On visiting Exeter House in 1839 Lord Stanhope noted the drawing room on the first floor, the room in which the final Council of War was held, as being "…unaltered, it is all over wainscotted with ancient oak, very dark and handsome…". It was reached by a dark oak staircase, with carved balustrades. Another visitor, a Mrs. Thomson, described the house as standing back from Full Street within a small rectangular court. The wide staircase ascended from a small hall to the drawing room; on either side of the drawing room were small panelled rooms which had served as the bedrooms for the prince and his officers. A spacious drawing room on the ground floor (altered by Mousely) gave access to a long garden, enclosed between high walls, which led down to the riverside.

Mousely had intended to sell off the panelling from the house in separate lots. However an appeal by Michael Thomas Bass, Jr., the Earl of Chesterfield and William Bemrose among others persuaded Mousely to call off the sales. The panelling of the drawing room was instead removed to the cellars of the Derby Assembly Rooms. It was later reassembled within the Derby Museum and Art Gallery. In 2021 the exhibition of the Exeter Room in Derby was reconfigured and the mannequin of The Prince was gifted to the Battle of Prestonpans [1745] Heritage Trust which now displays him in its Museum & Jacobite Heritage Centre at Prestonpans Town Hall. Under his watchful eye the scene of the battle he won so convincingly there is depicted in a diorama and the 103 metre Prestonpans Tapestry displayed in sequence.

Below is an extract from Stephen Glover's History of Derby (1843):

References

History of Derby
Houses in Derby
Jacobite rising of 1745
Houses completed in the 17th century
Buildings and structures demolished in 1854
Demolished buildings and structures in England